The Archaeological Museum of Nemea is a museum in Nemea, Corinthia, Greece. It was constructed by the University of California and given to the Greek State in 1984. The museum is located at the entrance to the Archaeological site of Nemea. Exhibits finds from this site and the surrounding areas, from Cooper Age (Chalcolithic) to early Byzantine era.

Collections 
The museum contains a collection of pictures of Nemea by travellers of the 18th and 20th centuries, coins of ancient visitors to Nemea, items related to the athletic activity on the site, prehistoric finds (pottery, tools, weapons etc.) from sites in the district of Nemea, pottery and jewellery from the Mycenaean cemetery at Aidonia and the settlement of Aghia Eirene, architectural parts from monuments at Nemea and other sites, and a collection of inscriptions from Nemea, Phlius and Petri. 

The museum puts on display a collection of discoveries from the Early Helladic era until the Early Christian period. These finds were excavated at ancient Nemea, Kleones, Fliountas, and the Mycenaean cemetery of Aidonia. The most significant finds are the pieces of gold jewelry dating back to the 15th century BC.

References

External links

shelton.berkeley.edu
Hellenic Ministry of Culture and Tourism
Nemea. A Guide to the Site and Museum
The Nemean Games

Nemea
Corinthia